The City of Nunawading was a local government area about  east of Melbourne, the state capital of Victoria, Australia.

History

Nunawading was originally part of the Nunawading Road District, which was incorporated on 7 August 1857. The district was renamed the Shire of Nunawading on 4 May 1872. On 26 May 1925, the Shire of Blackburn and Mitcham came into being, when the eastern two-thirds of the district seceded; the western part went on to become the City of Box Hill. The shire was proclaimed as the City of Nunawading on 30 May 1945.

On 15 December 1994, the City of Nunawading was abolished, and along with the City of Box Hill, was merged into the newly created City of Whitehorse.

Council meetings were held at the Nunawading Town Hall, on Whitehorse Road, Nunawading. It is used today for the same purpose by the City of Whitehorse.

Cr Noel Spurr OAM was elected the last Mayor of Nunawading, and in 1997 was elected to the inaugural Whitehorse City Council.

Wards

The City of Nunawading was subdivided into four wards, each electing three councillors. The wards were divided from each other by Canterbury Road and Springvale Road:
 North West Ward
 North East Ward
 South West Ward
 South East Ward

Suburbs
 Blackburn
 Blackburn North
 Blackburn South
 Burwood East
 Forest Hill
 Mitcham (shared with the City of Doncaster & Templestowe)
 Nunawading*
 Vermont
 Vermont South

* Council seat.

Population

* Estimate in the 1958 Victorian Year Book.

References

External links
 Victorian Places - Nunawading

Nunawading
City of Whitehorse
1925 establishments in Australia
1994 disestablishments in Australia